Rosemary Hawley Jarman (27 April 1935 – 17 March 2015) was an English novelist and writer of short stories. Her first novel in 1971 shed light on King Richard III of England.

Life
Jarman was born in Worcester. She was educated first at Saint Mary's Convent and then at The Alice Ottley School, leaving at 18 to study singing in London for the next three years, having developed a fine soprano voice.

Family circumstances prevented her from continuing with this, and she worked for a time in local government. She married David Jarman in 1958, but divorced amicably from him in 1970. She lived most of her time at Callow End, Worcestershire, between Worcester and Upton on Severn.

In 1986 Jarman moved to Pembrokeshire in Wales with the prize-winning naturalist author R. T. Plumb. They married in September 2002, but Plumb died of cancer in October 2003.

Writings
Jarman began to write for pleasure. She developed an obsession with the character of King Richard III (1452–1485, reigned 1483–1485), and with no thought of publication completed a 228,000 word novel showing the king in his true colours, away from Tudor and Shakespearian propaganda. The book was taken up almost accidentally by an agent. Within six weeks a contract for its publication and for four other novels was signed with William Collins Publishers (now HarperCollins).

The author had short stories published in magazines in the UK and France and was a member of the Society of Authors from 1970. She was dubbed "A Daughter of Mark Twain" by the Samuel Clemens Society in the US for her services to literature.

Published works

We Speak No Treason (1971), awarded The Silver Quill and the Author's Club First Novel Award. (Later published as two volumes: 1) The Flowering of the Rose and 2) The White Rose Turned to Blood, Tempus, 2006)
The King's Grey Mare (1972)
Crispin's Day (1978)
Crown in Candlelight (1978)
The Courts of Illusion (1983)
The Mists of Melusine (Daw Books) 1996.
The Mammoth Book of Historical Erotica (1999) Three short stories.
"Ai No Corrida" published in Eros in Hell (Creation Books 1998).

References

1935 births
Living people
Writers from Worcester, England
20th-century English novelists
English short story writers
British women short story writers
English women novelists
Writers of historical fiction set in the Middle Ages
20th-century English women writers
Women historical novelists
20th-century British short story writers